Greg Costello (born 5 April 1970 in Dublin) is an Irish former footballer.

A full back Greg made his League of Ireland debut for Shelbourne at home to St Pat's on 11 January 1991. He scored the winner for Shels in the 1993 FAI Cup Final at Lansdowne Road.

Costello scored in a UEFA Cup Winners' Cup win in September 1993.

He joined Shamrock Rovers in 2001 where he made 2 appearances in European competition, after spells at Kilkenny City and Athlone Town.

Honours
League of Ireland: 1
 Shelbourne 1991/92
FAI Cup: 3
 Shelbourne 1993, 1996, 1997

References

1970 births
Living people
Republic of Ireland association footballers
Republic of Ireland youth international footballers
Association football defenders
Shelbourne F.C. players
Shamrock Rovers F.C. players
Kilkenny City A.F.C. players
Athlone Town A.F.C. players
League of Ireland players
League of Ireland XI players
Association footballers from County Dublin